Last Hero 2 (Posledniy Geroy 2) – is the 2nd season of the Russian version of Survivor, Last Hero, hosted by Dmitry Pevtsov.

Contestants

The Total Votes is the number of votes a castaway has received during Tribal Councils where the castaway is eligible to be voted out of the game. It does not include the votes received during the final Tribal Council.

References

Last Hero seasons
2002 Russian television seasons
Television shows filmed in Malaysia